Energy in Iraq is mostly oil and gas.

Overview

Oil production 

In 2008, Iraq was the 9th highest crude oil exporter with 88 Mt.

Oil provided 85% of government income. Iraq's oil reserves were the third biggest in the world, after Saudi Arabia and Iran. In June 2009 oil production rights in the Rumaila oil field were sold to BP and China National Petroleum for 20 years contracts. Investments are estimated as $10–20 billion.

A second auction took place in December 2009, and Iraq sold rights to seven oil fields for 20 years, increasing oil production  in future. The production companies will receive between $1 and $5.5 per barrel produced:
 West Qurna Field  oil: Lukoil 85% and StatoilHydro 15%
 Majnoon oil field  oil: Shell and Petronas
 Halfaya Field: CNPC (Petronas / Total)
 Qaiyarah and Najmah field: Sonangol
 Garraf field: Petronas ja Japan Petroleum Exploration Company Limited JAPEX
 Badra field: Gazprom, Petronas, Korea Gas Corporation (KOGAS) ja TPAO

Electricity

As of June 2013, the total capacity of the electricity sector in Iraq is about 10,000 megawatt (MW). 
In 2006, the average peak electricity supply was 4,280 MW falling short of demand averaged 8,180 MW by about 3,950 MW.
According to the United States Department of Energy officials, demand for electricity has been stimulated by a growing economy and a surge in consumer purchases of appliances and electronics. 
In addition, electricity is subsidized in Iraq, which leads to increased demand.

Policy 
Oil revenues are the major income in the economy of Iraq.

Based on data from BP at the end of 2009 the highest proved oil reserves including the non-conventional oil deposits are in 1) Saudi Arabia (18 per cent of global reserves) 2) Canada (12%, mostly oil sands) 3) Venezuela (12%, mostly tar sands) 4) Iran (9%) and 5) Iraq (8%)

Oil prices 
Iraq is a member of OPEC.

The global oil and gas prices have been strongly influenced by political decisions and events. For example, the oil embargo 1967 and 1973 oil crisis during the 1970s, the Iran-Iraq War in the 1980s, the Iraq-Kuwait War in the 1990s and the Iraq War from 2003.

Corruption risks 

One of the corruption risks is that the oil resources are publicly owned but often privately produced. The complex system of licenses and fees may drive corruption incentives. According to Transparency International Bribe Payers Index 2008, the oil and gas industry in general is highly vulnerable to 1) bribery of public officials and 2) undue influence on the legislative process and government policies. IMF Working Paper confirms the relationship between oil rents and corruption. Higher increases in oil rents tends to increase corruption and erode political rights. Open Budget Survey 2008 by International Budget Partnership confirmed that the oil- and gas-dependent countries tend to be less transparent.

See also 
Oil megaprojects (2011)

References